Believe Me: The Abduction of Lisa McVey is a 2018 Canadian-American crime drama film, directed by Jim Donovan. The film was released on September 30, 2018, by Lifetime in United States  and by Showcase in Canada. On June 4, 2021, it was released worldwide by Netflix. The film stars Katie Douglas, Rossif Sutherland, and David James Elliott. The film recounts the true story of Lisa McVey who was abducted and raped for 26 hours by serial killer Bobby Joe Long in 1984.

In addition to its television broadcast, the film also received a special theatrical screening in Tampa, at the very same theater where Bobby Joe Long was arrested in 1984. The screening of this movie was attended by the real Lisa McVey Noland.

Plot
17-year-old Lisa McVey (Katie Douglas) lives with her neglectful grandmother Diane (Kim Horsman) and Diane's boyfriend Morris Elwood (Bruno Verdoni) in Tampa Bay, Florida. Morris regularly sexually assaults Lisa and her grandmother ignores it. One night on her way home from her job at a doughnut shop, Lisa is kidnapped by Bobby Joe Long (Rossif Sutherland). He rapes her in his car before taking her back to his studio apartment. Diane reports her missing, but casually assumes she has run away.

Bobby holds Lisa captive in his apartment, keeping her bound and blindfolded while he continually rapes her. When it is revealed that Bobby has been hurt by many women in the past, Lisa uses reverse psychology to gain his trust. Meanwhile, she leaves her fingerprints on surfaces in his bathroom and strands of her hair under his bed. She also memorizes as much as she can about Bobby and his apartment when she temporarily removes her blindfold when he is sleeping.

After 26 hours, Bobby tells Lisa he must get rid of her. He takes her to a secluded wooded area and holds a gun to her head. After hearing her plead for her life, Bobby lets her go and flees the scene in his car. Lisa memorizes her surroundings and then makes her way home. She bursts into her house telling her grandmother what happened to her, but she and Morris refuse to believe her. Diane finally calls the police and they come to get Lisa for questioning.

At the police station, a team of detectives are working on an extensive case involving nine women who have been found dead over the past few months. Sergeant Larry Pinkerton (David James Elliott), who specializes in Sex Crime, assigns himself to Lisa's case when other detectives find her story unconvincing, considering how much detailed information she is able to provide. Pinkerton believes Lisa and also believes her abductor is the serial killer they are looking for. Pinkerton sends Lisa's clothes for forensic testing; fibers on them match the fibers found on all bodies of the nine dead women.

Pinkerton and Lisa grow closer over time. She also confides in him about what is happening at home and Morris is later arrested for child abuse. Pinkerton removes Lisa from Diane's home and puts her in protective housing for young adults. Over the next few days, Lisa takes Pinkerton through her ordeal, starting in the parking lot where she was abducted and recalling the turns she remembers Bobby making on the drive to his apartment. Not long after, she discovers the tree where she was left and the police set up a two-mile radius search.

Pinkerton's deputy searches the area and spots a car similar to the one Lisa described Bobby driving. He manages to take a photograph of Bobby, allowing Lisa to positively ID him. Forensics later search his apartment and find all forensic evidence Lisa left behind. On November 16, 1984, Bobby is arrested outside a movie theater. Lisa is applauded for her bravery and ability to help with the case.

Pinkerton offers Lisa a place at his house but she politely declines, and goes to live with her Aunt Carol and Uncle Jim. She tells Pinkerton he hasn't seen the last of her and the two share an emotional goodbye before she drives away.

A postscript revealed that Lisa lived happily with Aunt Carol, Uncle Jim, and Lorrie for many years. Pinkerton remains friends with Lisa to this day. As it shows an adult Lisa near the same tree before she drives off, the post-script continues by stating that Lisa became a deputy sergeant in Sex Crimes, working to protect young people from situations similar to hers. Bobby Joe Long remains on death row. A later airing of this film added that he was eventually executed in prison via lethal injection in 2019.

Cast
 Katie Douglas as Lisa McVey
 Deanna Interbartolo as Young Lisa McVey
 Rossif Sutherland as Bobby Joe Long
 David James Elliott as Detective Larry Pinkerton
 Bruno Verdoni as Morris Elwood
 Megan Fahlenblock as Betty McVey
 Amanda Arcuri as Lorrie McVey
 Kiera Scharf as Young Lori McVey
 Kim Horsman as Grandma Diane McVey
 Shelby Bain as Sarah Pinkerton
 Jamie Robinson as Ed
 Milton Barnes as Detective Lopez
 Patrice Goodman as Detective Russell
 Alexandra Castillo as Detective King
 Kerry Griffin as Uncle Jim
 Catherine Tait as Aunt Carol
 Lisa McVey Noland as herself

Awards
The film won the Canadian Screen Award for Best TV Movie and Best Writing in a Television Film (Christina Welsh), at the 8th Canadian Screen Awards in 2020. It was also nominated for Best Lead Performance in a Television Film or Miniseries (Douglas), Best Supporting Actor in a Drama Series or Program (Sutherland), Best Direction in a Television Film (Donovan), and Best Photography in a Drama Program or Series (Sasha Moric).

Douglas received an ACTRA Award nomination for Outstanding Performance by an Actress from ACTRA's Toronto chapter in 2019. The film received three Directors Guild of Canada award nominations, for Best Production Design in a Television Film (Helen Kotsonis), Best Editing in a Television Film (Lisa Grootenboer) and Best Sound Editing in a Television Film (Brian Eimer, Michael Bonini).

References

External links
 

2018 crime drama films
2018 films
2018 television films
Canadian crime drama films
Canadian drama television films
English-language Canadian films
Gemini and Canadian Screen Award for Best Television Film or Miniseries winners
2010s Canadian films